YM-31636 is a potent and selective 5-HT3 agonist. Systemic administration of YM-31636 increased the number of fecal pellets in rats, and improves colonic motility. It also increases colonic secretions, but not to the point of inducing diarrhea. In addition, it did not reduce the visceral pain threshold, or increase the intensity of visceral pain. These properties indicate that it could be a useful treatment for constipation.

References

Imidazoles
Indenes
Serotonin receptor agonists
Thiazoles
5-HT3 agonists